Gambusia krumholzi (spotfin gambusia) is a species of fish in the family Poeciliidae endemic to Mexico.

The fish is named in honor of Louis A. Krumholz (1909-1981) of the University of Louisville (Kentucky, USA), for his contributions to the knowledge of aquatic biology.

References

krumholzi
Freshwater fish of Mexico
Endemic fish of Mexico
Taxa named by Wendell L. Minckley
Fish described in 1963
Taxonomy articles created by Polbot